Richard Anthony Newman (born 17 March 1943) is an English rock drummer. He was at various times a member of the bands Sounds Incorporated, May Blitz, Three Man Army, T. Rex, and Boxer. He has  performed with Little Richard, Jeff Beck, David Bowie, George Harrison, Robert Palmer, Eric Clapton, Donovan, Mick Ronson, Gene Vincent, Crystal Gayle, the Everly Brothers and others. In 1965, Newman played with Sounds Incorporated as one of the acts opening for the Beatles at Shea Stadium in New York.

He played on Donovan's "Barabajagal" (1968), as well as on Jeff Beck's Beck-Ola (1969). For David Bowie, he performed on the Diamond Dogs album in 1974, and live with Bowie on his subsequent North American tour, including a recording at the Tower Theater released as David Live. Newman was one of the featured drummers on the soundtrack to the film version of The Who's Tommy.

In 1977, he played with Dino Dines, and Herbie Flowers on Marc Bolan's Marc television series.

His son, Richard Newman, is also a drummer who has performed regularly with Sam Brown and Deborah Bonham among others, and has also played drums for Jefferson Starship on several UK tours.

Collaborations
With David Bowie
 Diamond Dogs (RCA Records, 1974)

With Crystal Gayle
 Best Always (Branson Entertainment, 1993)

With John Prine
 Aimless Love (Oh Boy Records, 1984)
 A John Prine Christmas (Oh Boy Records, 1993)

With Madeline Bell
 Comin' Atcha (RCA Victor, 1973)

With Jackie Lomax
 Is This What You Want? (Apple Records, 1969)

With Joan Armatrading
 Back to the Night (A&M Records, 1975)

With Sam Brown
 43 Minutes (All At Once Records, 1993)

References

External links
Exclusive interview with Tony Newman – 2006

1943 births
Living people
English rock drummers
Musicians from Southampton
English session musicians
T. Rex (band) members
The Jeff Beck Group members